Romain Lagarde  (born 5 March 1997) is a French handball player for Pays d'Aix Université Club and the French national team.

He was part of the French team that won bronze medals at the 2018 European Men's Handball Championship.

References

External links

1997 births
Living people
French male handball players
Sportspeople from Lorient
Expatriate handball players
French expatriate sportspeople in Germany
Rhein-Neckar Löwen players
Handball-Bundesliga players
Medalists at the 2020 Summer Olympics
Olympic gold medalists for France
Olympic medalists in handball
Handball players at the 2020 Summer Olympics
Olympic handball players of France